The 2001–02 season was the Persepolis's 1st season in the Pro League, and their 19th consecutive season in the top division of Iranian Football. They were also be competing in the Hazfi Cup. Persepolis was captained by Afshin Peyrovani.

Squad

Technical staff

|}

Competitions

Overview

Iran Pro League

Standings

Matches

Hazfi Cup 

Round of 32

Round of 16

Quarterfinals

Persepolis F.C. seasons
Persepolis